NGC 413 is a spiral galaxy of type SB(r)c located in the constellation Cetus. It was discovered in 1886 by Francis Leavenworth. It was described by Dreyer as "extremely faint, pretty small, very little extended."

Image gallery

References

External links
 

0413
Astronomical objects discovered in 1886
Cetus (constellation)
Barred spiral galaxies
004347